Bøkfjord Bridge (Norwegian: Bøkfjordbrua) is a road bridge which crosses Paatsjoki river at its mouth into Bøkfjord, in Sør-Varanger municipality in Troms og Finnmark, Norway.

The main bridge was built in parts in Nordhausen, Germany, assembled in Wilhelmshaven, Germany and transported by boat to the place. It was put into place on May 20, 2017. It was opened for traffic on 28 September 2017, inaugurated by the minister of transport Ketil Solvik-Olsen (Norway) and vice minister of transport Sergey Aristov (Russia), who also marked the opening of other new roads on E105 between Kirkenes and Zapolyarny. It replaces the old, low and narrow Elvenes Bridge.

References

Eksterne lenker 
E105 Hesseng–Storskog, project site (in Norwegian)

Road bridges in Troms og Finnmark
Sør-Varanger